The Perhimpoenan Indonesia (PI;) was student association in the Netherlands in the first half of the twentieth century. It was established under the Dutch name Indische Vereeniging (Indies' Association), and it changed its name to Indonesische Vereeniging (Indonesian Association) in 1922, and its Malay translation Perhimpoenan Indonesia in 1925. Although small in membership numbers - throughout the period between 30 and 150 members - the organization was important because it was one of the first to campaign for full Indonesian independence from the Netherlands, and because many PI-students would later acquire prominent political positions in the independent state of Indonesia.

History
The Perhimpoenan Indonesia was established in 1908 under the name of Indische Vereeniging and was initially a social club, providing a sociable environment for students from the Netherlands East Indies in the Netherlands. After the First World War the association politicized and changed its name to Indonesische Vereeniging in 1922, and Perhimpoenan Indonesia in 1925. From that moment onwards, it was an explicitly anti-colonial, nationalist organization with a strong anti-capitalist outlook. This was clearly visible in its journal Indonesia Merdeka ('Indonesia Free').

The new principles of 1925 were:
 'Only a united Indonesia putting aside particularistic differences, can break the power of the oppressors. The common aim – the creation of a free Indonesia – demands the building of nationalism based on a conscious self-reliant mass action. [...]
 An essential condition for the achievement of this aim is the participation of all layers of the Indonesian people in a unified struggle for Independence. 
 The essential and dominant element in every colonial political problem is the conflict of interest between the rulers and the ruled. The tendency of the ruling side to blur and mask this must be countered by a sharpening and accentuation of this conflict of interests.'

Important students in the first half of the 1920s were Soetomo, Nazir Pamontjak, Mohammed Hatta and Achmad Soebardjo. In the end of the 1920s and the 1930s Soetan Sjahrir, Abdulmadjid Djojoadhiningrat and Roestam Effendi gained in prominence. Via the return of its members, the PI was influential in the forging of a nationalist non-cooperationist movement in the Netherlands Indies. (Former) PI-members stood at the basis of the establishment of the Indonesian nationalist organizations PNI and PPPKI.

Foreign action
After the nationalist turn, the PI saw it as one of its principle tasks to seek support from anti-colonial and anti-imperialist organizations and movements in other parts of Europe. It also wanted to demonstrate the crimes and horrors of Dutch colonialism in the Netherlands Indies to the outside world. By sending informal 'ambassadors' to Paris, Brussels and Berlin the Indonesian students established contact with prominent activists and anti-colonial movements, among whom Jawaharlal Nehru of the Indian National Congress, Messali Hadj of the Algerian Étoile Nord-Africaine, and activists of the Chinese Kuomintang. Indonesian students were also present at the pacifist Congrès Democratique International in August 1926 in the French town of Bierville, and at several meetings of the League against Imperialism from February 1927 onwards. Mohammad Hatta, who was the chair and most important of the Indonesian students, was appointed in the Executive Committee of the LAI, and thus acquired much prominence and an extensive international network.

Persecution of the students
Troubled by the foreign activities of the Perhimpoenan Indonesia and the contacts with the communist Comintern, the Dutch authorities decided to crack down on the students in 1927, and to charge the students with sedition in Indonesia Merdeka. On 10 June 1927 house raids took place in Leiden and The Hague, in which large quantities of documents were seized. On 23 September, Mohammad Hatta, Ali Sastroamidjojo, Abdoelmadjid Djojoadhiningrat and Nazir Pamontjak were arrested and put under charge. The court case, which took place in March 1928, led to the release of all the students. The PI and Hatta gained much publicity in the Netherlands and the Netherlands Indies. The brochure Indonesia Free which Hatta wrote in jail became a widely read document among Indonesian nationalists.

Communist turn
Nonetheless, the confrontation with the authorities also implied that many of the most active students refrained from further activities, and that the membership of the PI dwindled. Largely inactive, the leadership of the association was finally taken up by a group of communist Indonesian students under Abdulmadjid Djojoadhiningrat. Prominent nationalists, among whom Hatta and Sjahrir, were expelled from the association, and de facto the PI changed into a front organization of the Communist Party of the Netherlands.

In 1933 the PI-chair Roestam Effendi was elected as the first Indonesian in the Dutch Parliament as part of the CPH.

During the Second World War between 60 and 110 PI-members participated in the resistance against fascism.

References

Further reading
John Ingleson, Perhimpunan Indonesia and the Indonesian Nationalist Movement, 1923-1928. (Victoria: Monash University Centre of Southeast Asian studies, 1975)
John Ingleson, Road to Exile: The Indonesian Nationalist Movement, 1927-1934. (Singapore: Heinemann, 1980) 1-18.
Harry A. Poeze, In het land van de Overheerser: Indonesiërs in Nederland 1600-1950 (Dordrecht: Foris Publications, 1986).
Klaas Stutje, 'Indonesian Identities Abroad: International Engagement of Colonial Students in the Netherlands, 1908-1931', in: BMGN: Low Countries Historical Review, Volume 128-1 (2013) pp. 151–172.
Klaas Stutje, 'To maintain an independent course. Interwar Indonesian nationalism and international communism on a Dutch-European stage', in: Dutch Crossing, Volume 39-2 (2015).

Dutch East Indies